Puronga is a rural locality (a village) in Ustretskoye Rural Settlement, Syamzhensky District, Vologda Oblast, Russia. The population was 17 as of 2002.

Geography 
Puronga is located 29 km northwest of Syamzha (the district's administrative centre) by road. Klokovo is the nearest rural locality.

References 

Rural localities in Syamzhensky District